Ottone "Totò" Mignone (1906–1993) was an Italian dancer and actor of the stage and film. He was the elder brother of the actress and singer Milly.

Selected filmography
 Five to Nil (1932)
 The Taming of the Shrew (1942)
 The Woman of Sin (1942)
 A Little Wife (1943)
 Anything for a Song (1943)
 The Last Wagon (1943)
 The Two Orphans (1947)
 Cab Number 13 (1948)
 Toto Tours Italy (1948)
 The Firemen of Viggiu (1949)
 Adam and Eve (1949)
 Totò Tarzan (1950)
 47 morto che parla (1950)
 Toto the Third Man (1951)
 Sardinian Vendetta (1952)
 Neapolitan Turk (1953)
 An American in Rome (1954)
 Toto, Peppino and the Fanatics (1958)
 How to Kill 400 Duponts (1967)
 Bloody Friday (1972)
 Ginger and Fred (1986)

References

Bibliography
 Tullio Kezich. Federico Fellini - Il libro dei film. Rizzoli, 2009.

External links

1906 births
1993 deaths
Italian male film actors
Italian male stage actors
People from Alessandria